Phun City was a rock festival held at Ecclesden Common near Worthing, England, from 24 July to 26 July 1970.  Excluding the one-day free concerts in London's Hyde Park, Phun City became the first large-scale free festival in the UK.

History
Organised by the UK Underground anarchist Mick Farren and financed by Ronan O'Rahilly, the festival was notable for having no fences and no admission fees. It was not intended to be a free concert, but funding was withdrawn a few days before the event. Rather than cancel it, the organisers told the scheduled bands who turned up that they would have to give their services for nothing. Remarkably, most of the acts stayed on. Free were billed to play, but withdrew – Farren later noted in his memoirs the irony of a band named Free refusing to play for free. Those who did appear included MC5, The Pretty Things, Kevin Ayers, Steve Peregrin Took's band Shagrat, Edgar Broughton Band, Mungo Jerry, Mighty Baby and Pink Fairies "who were taking all their clothes off as they played". The Beat generation poet William Burroughs also appeared. 

The Hells Angels – UK had been hired as the security force, but Farren said, "It slowly dawned on us that although none of our original plans had come together, we were no longer in control." Instead, the audience themselves were now in charge, with the organizers just making sure the bands came and went – it was, if somewhat inadvertently, the first large-scale "people's festival" held in the UK.

The poster art was by Edward Barker.

Legacy
Camping at the festival, Worthing teenager Billy Idol saw MC5 play, saying later "I didn't realize it then but I had just seen the future of rock". Mick Jones another future punk pioneer was also enthusiastic  "That was the first time MC5 had played. My overriding memory was falling into a ditch! That was a great festival".

See also

 Festivals in the United Kingdom
List of historic rock festivals
List of free festivals

References

External links
 Festival Archive – Phun City Pages
 International Times Archive - IT85 - 13 Aug 1970 - Phun City
 Phun City by Worthing artist Dan Thompson
 Get On Down: A Decade of Rock and Roll Posters, edited by Mick Farren (1977).

Free festivals
Counterculture festivals
Music festivals in West Sussex
1970 in England
1970 in music
Worthing
Music festivals established in 1970
Rock festivals in the United Kingdom
1970 music festivals